Lacticaseibacillus is a genus of lactic acid bacteria.

Species
The genus Lacticaseibacillus comprises the following species:
 Lacticaseibacillus absianus Bai et al. 2021
 Lacticaseibacillus baoqingensis (Long and Gu 2019) Zheng et al. 2020
 Lacticaseibacillus brantae (Volokhov et al. 2012) Zheng et al. 2020
 Lacticaseibacillus camelliae (Tanasupawat et al. 2007) Zheng et al. 2020
 Lacticaseibacillus casei (Orla-Jensen 1916) Zheng et al. 2020
 Lacticaseibacillus chiayiensis (Huang et al. 2018) Zheng et al. 2020
 Lacticaseibacillus daqingensis (Long et al. 2020) Zheng et al. 2020
 Lacticaseibacillus hegangensis (Long et al. 2020) Zheng et al. 2020
 Lacticaseibacillus hulanensis (Zhao and Gu 2019) Zheng et al. 2020
 Lacticaseibacillus jixianensis (Long and Gu 2019) Zheng et al. 2020
 Lacticaseibacillus manihotivorans (Morlon-Guyot et al. 1998) Zheng et al. 2020
 Lacticaseibacillus nasuensis (Cai et al. 2012) Zheng et al. 2020
 Lacticaseibacillus pantheris (Liu and Dong 2002) Zheng et al. 2020
 Lacticaseibacillus paracasei (Collins et al. 1989) Zheng et al. 2020
 Lacticaseibacillus porcinae (Nguyen et al. 2013) Zheng et al. 2020
 Lacticaseibacillus rhamnosus (Hansen 1968) Zheng et al. 2020
 Lacticaseibacillus saniviri (Oki et al. 2012) Zheng et al. 2020
 Lacticaseibacillus sharpeae (Weiss et al. 1982) Zheng et al. 2020
 Lacticaseibacillus songhuajiangensis (Gu et al. 2013) Zheng et al. 2020
 Lactobacillus suibinensis (Long et al. 2020) Zheng et al. 2020
 Lacticaseibacillus thailandensis (Tanasupawat et al. 2007) Zheng et al. 2020
 Lacticaseibacillus yichunensis (Long et al. 2020) Zheng et al. 2020
 Lacticaseibacillus zeae (Dicks et al. 1996) Liu and Gu 2020
 Lacticaseibacillus zhaodongensis (Li et al. 2020) Liu and Gu 2020

Phylogeny
The currently accepted taxonomy is based on the List of Prokaryotic names with Standing in Nomenclature and the phylogeny is based on whole-genome sequences.

References

Lactobacillaceae
Bacteria genera